Scarlett Johansson is an American actress who has appeared in films, television series, video games and stage plays. Johansson made her debut in the 1994 comedy-drama North. Her first lead role was as the 11-year-old sister of a pregnant teenager in Manny & Lo (1996), for which she received a nomination for the Independent Spirit Award for Best Female Lead. Johansson starred in Robert Redford's drama The Horse Whisperer (1998), and appeared with Thora Birch and Steve Buscemi in the black comedy Ghost World (2001). Two years later, Johansson played a woman in her 20s stuck in a listless marriage who befriends an aging American actor (Bill Murray) in Japan in the Sofia Coppola-directed Lost in Translation, and also played a servant in Dutch painter Johannes Vermeer's household in Girl with a Pearl Earring with Colin Firth. She was nominated at the 61st Golden Globe Awards for both films, and received the BAFTA Award for Best Actress in a Leading Role for the former.

Two years later, Johansson starred in Woody Allen's psychological thriller Match Point, for which she garnered a nomination for the Golden Globe Award for Best Supporting Actress – Motion Picture. In 2006, she appeared in Christopher Nolan's psychological thriller The Prestige, and played a journalism student in Allen's Scoop. In the same year, Johansson made her first appearance as host of the television variety show Saturday Night Live, which she has since hosted a further five times as of 2019. Two years later, Johansson starred in Allen's romantic comedy-drama Vicky Cristina Barcelona with Javier Bardem and Penelope Cruz, and portrayed Queen of England Anne Boleyn's sister Mary in the historical drama The Other Boleyn Girl (2008) with Natalie Portman and Eric Bana. She received the Tony Award for Best Featured Actress in a Play for her Broadway debut performance in the 2010 revival of Arthur Miller's A View from the Bridge.

She played Black Widow in the Marvel Cinematic Universe (MCU) superhero film Iron Man 2 (2010). Johansson reprised the role in the Joss Whedon-directed The Avengers in 2012. The following year, she starred in the Broadway revival of the Tennessee Williams play Cat on a Hot Tin Roof with Ciarán Hinds, and voiced an artificially intelligent virtual assistant in Spike Jonze's Her with Joaquin Phoenix. Johansson appeared as Black Widow in the MCU superhero film Captain America: The Winter Soldier, its sequel Captain America: Civil War, Avengers: Age of Ultron, Avengers: Infinity War, and Avengers: Endgame—the lattermost is the second-highest grossing film of all time. Johansson played a woman going through a divorce in Noah Baumbach's comedy-drama Marriage Story with Adam Driver, and a mother who hides a Jewish girl in Nazi Germany in Taika Waititi's satirical black comedy Jojo Rabbit (both in 2019). She received a nomination for the Academy Award for Best Actress for the former and a nomination in the Best Supporting Actress category for the latter.

Film

Television

Video games

Music videos

Stage

References

External links
 
 

Scarlett Johansson
Actress filmographies
American filmographies